There have been several notable brawls in the National Basketball Association:
The Pacers–Pistons brawl on November 19, 2004
The Knicks–Nuggets brawl on December 16, 2006